Alan Jones (6 October 1945 – 9 March 2023) was a Welsh footballer who played as a central defender during the 1960s and 1970s.

Jones started his career at hometown club Swansea City, then known as Swansea Town, and turned professional in October 1963. He went on to make 61 league appearances, scoring 6 goals, before joining Hereford United in 1968. He spent six seasons at Edgar Street and was a member of the team that famously knocked Newcastle United out of the FA Cup and gained election to the English Football League in the same season.

Jones later played for Southport, in the United States for Los Angeles Aztecs and latterly in the Welsh leagues, where he played for Ammanford and Haverfordwest County.

After retiring from football, he became a prison officer. Jones died on 9 March 2023, at the age of 77.

References

Sources 
"The Hereford United Story" (1974) by John Williamson

External links 

1945 births
2023 deaths
Welsh footballers
Footballers from Swansea
Association football central defenders
Wales under-23 international footballers
English Football League players
North American Soccer League (1968–1984) players
Swansea City A.F.C. players
Hereford United F.C. players
Southport F.C. players
Los Angeles Aztecs players
Haverfordwest County A.F.C. players
Ammanford A.F.C. players
Welsh expatriate footballers
Welsh expatriate sportspeople in the United States
Expatriate soccer players in the United States
British prison officers